Ramla Said Ahmed Ali (born 16 September 1989) is a Somali professional boxer and model. She is the first Somali boxer to compete at the Olympic Games and is currently a global brand ambassador for Cartier & Christian Dior. She is the first female in history to have competed in a professional boxing competition in the Kingdom of Saudia Arabia.

Career

Boxing
As an amateur, Ali won the 2015 Novice national championships in England, the 2016 England Boxing Elite National Championships, the 2016 Great British Championships, and the 2019 African Zone featherweight title.

Ali initially represented England but, in 2018, changed to represent Somalia. She has not returned to Somalia since leaving as a child but wanted to help put the country in the headlines for positive reasons. She became the first boxer to win an international gold medal while representing Somalia. Later, in 2021, she competed in the women's featherweight event at the 2020 Summer Olympics. Although she lost her first fight, she became the first boxer ever to represent Somalia on the Olympic stage.

In 2022, she defeated Dominican boxer Crystal Garcia Nova in the first professional women’s boxing match held in Saudi Arabia.

Modelling
Ramla has been in global campaigns for brands; Nike, Beats By Dre, Coach, Brunello Cucinelli, Dior & Cartier and has appeared on the front cover of British Vogue, Grazia,Wall Street Journal, Financial Times, Guardian Observer, Wonderland, ELLE, The Square Mile, The Week, Beauty Papers, ES Magazine, The Violet Book, Swiss Style, M Milenio Magazine, Exit Magazine and Puss Puss Magazine and been photographed for publications Time Magazine, Spanish Vogue, NY T Magazine, Sunday Times Style, Twin, Times Luxx, Gentlewoman & Conde Nast, .

Writing
Ramla's debut novel Not Without A Fight is a self-help book based on ten of the most important fights in her life. It was published by Merky Books & Penguin Random House. It has also been announced that Academy Award nominated, BAFTA winning producer Lee Magiday will be making a feature-length drama in collaboration with Film4 based on the life story of Ramla Ali.

Campaigning and advocacy
Ali helped set up Somalia's boxing federation in Mogadishu and became the first boxer to have represented Somalia in the Women's World Championships, held in New Delhi, India.

In January 2018, Ali launched The Sisters Club, a charitable initiative created to provide spaces for Muslim women and minorities to learn and enjoy boxing in the U.K. Subsequently, the initiative expanded to also welcome women who have experienced sexual assault or domestic violence to learn self-defence. The charity partnered with brands Nike, Sports Direct & Everlast to expand its program in 2021, enabling it to reach more women across the country.

Ali committed to giving 25 percent of her first year's earnings as a professional to Black Lives Matter charities.

Personal life
Ali moved to England from Somalia as a refugee from the Somali Civil War. When Ali was a toddler, her brother was killed at the age of 12 by a mortar when playing outside, prompting the family to leave for the UK via Kenya. She started boxing as a teenager in an effort to lose weight.

Honours 
She was one of fifteen women selected to appear on the cover of the September 2019 issue of British Vogue by guest editor Meghan, Duchess of Sussex.

Professional boxing record

References

Living people
Somalian emigrants to the United Kingdom
British women boxers
Featherweight boxers
Somalian sportswomen
Sportspeople from Mogadishu
Olympic boxers of Somalia
Boxers at the 2020 Summer Olympics
1989 births